NGC 823, also known as IC 1782, is an unbarred lenticular galaxy in the constellation Fornax. It is estimated to be 194 million light-years from the Milky Way and has a diameter of approximately 100,000 light years. NGC 823 was discovered on October 14, 1830, by astronomer John Herschel.

SN 2022abid (ZTF22abyelas) a Type Ia supernova from an exploding white dwarf was discovered on 23 November 2022.

See also 
 List of NGC objects (1–1000)

References 

Unbarred lenticular galaxies
Fornax (constellation)
0823
IC objects
008093